Anastasios Schizas (born 18 February 1977) is a Greek retired water polo player who competed in the 2004 Summer Olympics (4th place) and the 2008 Summer Olympics (7th place). Schizas was part of the Greece men's national water polo team that won the Bronze Medal in the 2005 World Championship in Montreal and the Bronze Medal in the 2004 World League in Long Beach.

Schizas started his career at Poseidon Ilision and then played for Ethnikos Piraeus. In 2002 he signed for Olympiacos where he had a long and successful career, playing for twelve consecutive seasons (2002–2014) and winning 21 major titles (1 LEN Super Cup, 10 Greek Championships and 10 Greek Cups).

Honours

Club
Olympiacos
 LEN Super Cup (1): 2002
 Greek Championship (10): 2002–03, 2003–04, 2004–05, 2006–07, 2007–08, 2008–09, 2009–10, 2010–11, 2012–13, 2013–14
 Greek Cup (10): 2002–03, 2003–04, 2005–06, 2006–07, 2007–08, 2008–09, 2009–10, 2010–11, 2012–13, 2013–14
Ethnikos

 Greek Cup (1): 1999–00

National team
  Bronze Medal in 2005 World Championship, Montreal
  Bronze Medal in 2004 World League, Long Beach
 4th place in 2004 Olympic Games, Athens
 4th place in 2003 World Championship, Barcelona

See also
 List of World Aquatics Championships medalists in water polo

References

External links
 

1977 births
Living people
Greek male water polo players
Olympiacos Water Polo Club players
Olympic water polo players of Greece
Water polo players at the 2004 Summer Olympics
Water polo players at the 2008 Summer Olympics
World Aquatics Championships medalists in water polo

Ethnikos Piraeus Water Polo Club players
Water polo players from Athens